Jan Smeekens (born 11 February 1987) is a Dutch former speed skater. He is a 500 m specialist.

Smeekens won his first international medal during the 2004 World Junior Single Distance Championships in Moscow where he won the gold medal at the 500 m. At the 2006 KNSB Dutch Single Distance Championships on 28 October 2005 he made his début among the senior skaters in his country, resulting in claiming a World Cup spot for races in Collalbo and Baselga di Pinè. In the A-group of these World Cup meetings he finished in 6th and 7th position.

On 7 January 2006, later during the 2005–06 season he also made his début at the 2006 KNSB Dutch Sprint Championships. At these championships he won the second race over 500 m. In February 2006 Smeekens signed a professional contract with the TVM Speed skating team.

His first success in his new team was winning a silver medal on the 500 m at the 2007 KNSB Dutch Single Distance Championships. He won the first race beating all the favourites, while finishing second behind Jan Bos in the final race. Bos claimed and defended his title.

In 2006 Smeekens became the Dutch junior record holder in the 500 m with a personal best of 35.16, which he achieved during the 2006 speed skating finals in Calgary.

At the 2010 Winter Olympics in Vancouver, Smeekens finished sixth in the 500 m race.

He won Silver in the Men's 500 metres Speed Skating event at the 2014 Winter Olympics in Sochi, Russia; he had thought he won gold in that event, but his time was adjusted.

At the 2018 Winter Olympics in Pyeongchang, Smeekens finished tenth in the 500 m race.

Records

Personal records

Source: SpeedskatingResults.com

World records

Tournament overview

Source:
 DNF = Did not finish
 DNS = Did not start
 NC = No classification

World Cup

Source:

Medals won

References

1987 births
Dutch male speed skaters
Speed skaters at the 2010 Winter Olympics
Speed skaters at the 2014 Winter Olympics
Speed skaters at the 2018 Winter Olympics
Olympic speed skaters of the Netherlands
People from Raalte
Living people
Medalists at the 2014 Winter Olympics
Olympic medalists in speed skating
Olympic silver medalists for the Netherlands
World Single Distances Speed Skating Championships medalists
Sportspeople from Overijssel